Honchar (Cyrillic: Гончар) is an occupational surname of Ukrainian origin, the English equivalent being Potter. Its other transliterations may include Gonchar (Russian) or Hončar (Slovak). It may refer to:

Oles Honchar, Ukrainian writer
Serhiy Honchar, Ukrainian racing cyclist
Sergei Gonchar, Russian ice hockey player

See also
 
 
 Hanchar

Ukrainian-language surnames
Occupational surnames